Eastern Macedonia may refer to:

 eastern parts of the geographical and historical region of Macedonia (region)
 Pirin Macedonia, the part of the region of Macedonia in Bulgaria
 Eastern Macedonia and Thrace, an administrative region in Greece
 Eastern Statistical Region, a statistical region in modern North Macedonia
 eastern parts of the ancient Kingdom of Macedonia
 eastern parts of the ancient Roman Province of Macedonia
 Eastern Macedonia Army Section, an army group of the Hellenic Army in World War II
 Technological Educational Institute of Eastern Macedonia and Thrace, an institute in Kavala, Greece

See also
 Macedonia (disambiguation)
 Western Macedonia (disambiguation)